Darreh Morad (also Romanized as Darreh Morād and Darreh-ye Morād) is a village in Darreh Seydi Rural District, in the Central District of Borujerd County, Lorestan Province, Iran. At the 2006 census, its population was 143, in 31 families.

References 

Towns and villages in Borujerd County